Qian Yunjuan (born 11 March 1977) is a road cyclist from China. She represented her nation at the 2004 Summer Olympics in the women's road race. She also rode at the 2003 UCI Road World Championships.

References

External links
 Profile at Sports Reference

Chinese female cyclists
Cyclists at the 2004 Summer Olympics
Olympic cyclists of China
Living people
Place of birth missing (living people)
1977 births
Sportspeople from Wuxi
21st-century Chinese women